Jennifer Capriati defeated Martina Hingis in the final, 6–4, 6–3 to win the women's singles tennis title at the 2001 Australian Open. With the win, Capriati returned to the top 10 in rankings for the first time since 1993.

Lindsay Davenport was the defending champion, but lost to Capritati in the semifinals, in a rematch of their semifinals the previous year.

Seeds

Qualifying

Draw

Finals

Top half

Section 1

Section 2

Section 3

Section 4

Bottom half

Section 5

Section 6

Section 7

Section 8

References 
 2001 Australian Open draw

External links
 2001 Australian Open – Women's draws and results at the International Tennis Federation

2001 Australian Open
2001 WTA Tour
2001
2001 in Australian women's sport